The Last Word is a 2017 American comedy-drama film directed by Mark Pellington, from a screenplay by Stuart Ross Fink. It stars Amanda Seyfried and Shirley MacLaine.

The Last Word premiered at the 2017 Sundance Film Festival on January 24, 2017. It was released on March 3, 2017, by Bleecker Street.

Synopsis
A retired businesswoman wants to control everything around her, knowing that she only has a little time left before an imminent death due to a medical condition. She decides to craft her own obituary, so she hires a young obituary writer to work with her to ensure her life story is told her way. The businesswoman tries to expand the horizons of her life, and adopts a young kid for mentoring and lands herself a job as a disc jockey. She grows close with the young writer and influences her life.

Cast
 Shirley MacLaine as Harriett Lauler
 Amanda Seyfried as Anne Sherman
 AnnJewel Lee Dixon as Brenda
 Anne Heche as Elizabeth
 Tom Everett Scott as Ronald Odom
 Thomas Sadoski as Robin Sands
 Joel Murray as Joe Mueller
 Adina Porter as Bree Wilson
 Philip Baker Hall as Edward
 Sarah Baker as Zoe
 Steven Culp as Sam Serman
 Basil Hoffman as Christopher George
 Todd Louiso as Dr. Morgan

Production
In September 2015, it was announced that Amanda Seyfried and Shirley MacLaine would star in the film, with Mark Pellington directing from a screenplay by Stuart Ross Fink, while Myriad Pictures would handle sales and finance the film. In February 2016, Anne Heche, Philip Baker Hall, and Tom Everett Scott joined the cast of the film. Nathan Matthew David composed the film's score.

Filming
Principal photography began on February 3, 2016. and concluded on March 11, 2016.

Release
In November 2015, Bleecker Street acquired U.S distribution rights to the film. The film had its world premiere at the 2017 Sundance Film Festival on January 24, 2017. It was released on March 3, 2017. On its first weekend, the film grossed $35,000 from four theaters in New York and Los Angeles.

Critical reception
On Rotten Tomatoes, the film has an approval of 40% based on 95 reviews, with an average rating of 4.9/10. The website's critics consensus reads: "The Last Word proves Shirley MacLaine remains a wonderfully magnetic screen presence -- and deserving of a far better vehicle for her considerable talents." On Metacritic, the film has a score of 40 out of 100, based on 21 critics, indicating "mixed or average reviews".

References

External links
 
 
 
 
 

2017 films
American comedy-drama films
2017 independent films
Bleecker Street films
American independent films
Films about writers
2010s English-language films
2010s American films